Allolobophora is a genus of annelid belonging to the family Lumbricidae.

The genus was first described by Eisen in 1874.

Species:
 Allolobophora chlorotica

References

Lumbricidae